Gottfried Utiger (28 March 1912 – 1989) was a Swiss long-distance runner. He competed in the men's 5000 metres at the 1936 Summer Olympics.

References

External links

1912 births
1989 deaths
Athletes (track and field) at the 1936 Summer Olympics
Swiss male long-distance runners
Olympic athletes of Switzerland
Place of birth missing